Peter Francis Gleasure (born 8 October 1960) is an English former professional footballer who played as a goalkeeper in the Football League for Millwall, Northampton Town and Gillingham.

He kept a club record 112 clean sheets in 412 matches playing for Northampton Town and, only two players had made more appearances for the club. He won a Fourth Division championship medal in 1986–87 season with Northampton and was voted the club's Player of the Season the following season. He later had loan spells at Fisher Athletic and Gillingham before moving into non-league football with Hitchin Town, for which he made more than 100 appearances. He was awarded a testimonial match against a Tottenham Hotspur XI in 1993.

References

1960 births
Living people
Footballers from Luton
English footballers
Association football goalkeepers
Millwall F.C. players
Northampton Town F.C. players
Gillingham F.C. players
Hitchin Town F.C. players
English Football League players
Isthmian League players